"Gotta See Jane" is a song and single by Canadian singer-songwriter R. Dean Taylor written by Taylor, Eddie Holland of Holland-Dozier-Holland, and Motown songwriter Ronald Miller.

Released in 1968, it entered the UK chart in June and reached number 17 in August, staying on the chart for 12 weeks. The song appeared on Taylor's 1970 album I Think, Therefore I Am. In Canada, it reached number 12 on May 1, 1971. It was re-released in 1974, reaching number 41 in October, and again in 2004 as a b-side to a limited edition single with There's a Ghost in My House as the A-side.

Chart performance

Cover versions
The song was covered by The Fall on their 2001 album Are You Are Missing Winner.

References

Songs written by R. Dean Taylor
Songs written by Eddie Holland
1968 songs
1970 songs
1974 songs
2004 songs
Motown singles
Songs written by Ron Miller (songwriter)